Razavi may refer to:

Razavi (surname)
Razavi Khorasan Province, province in northeastern Iran
Razavi, Gonabad, village in Razavi Khorasan Province, Iran
Zir Ab, Razavi Khorasan, village in the Razavi Khorasan Province in the northeast of Iran